Bioethics is both a field of study and professional practice, interested in ethical issues related to health (primarily focused on the human, but also increasingly includes animal ethics), including those emerging from advances in biology, medicine, and technologies. It proposes the discussion about moral discernment in society (what decisions are "good" or "bad" and why) and it is often related to medical policy and practice, but also to broader questions as environment, well-being and public health. Bioethics is concerned with the ethical questions that arise in the relationships among life sciences, biotechnology, medicine, politics, law, theology and philosophy. It includes the study of values relating to primary care, other branches of medicine ("the ethics of the ordinary"), ethical education in science, animal, and environmental ethics, and public health.

Etymology
In 1970, the American biochemist, and oncologist Van Rensselaer Potter used the term to describe the relationship between the biosphere and a growing human population. Potter's work laid the foundation for global ethics, a discipline centered around the link between biology, ecology, medicine, and human values. Sargent Shriver, the spouse of Eunice Kennedy Shriver, claimed that he had invented the word "bioethics" in the living room of his home in Bethesda, Maryland, in 1970. He stated that he thought of the word after returning from a discussion earlier that evening at Georgetown University, where he discussed with others a possible Kennedy family sponsorship of an institute focused around the "application of moral philosophy to concrete medical dilemmas".

Purpose and scope 

The discipline of bioethics has addressed a wide swathe of human inquiry; ranging from debates over the boundaries of lifestyles (e.g. abortion, euthanasia), surrogacy, the allocation of scarce health care resources (e.g. organ donation, health care rationing), to the right to refuse medicalcare for religious or cultural reasons. Bioethicists generally fail to agree among themselves over the precise limits of their discipline, debating whether the field should concern itself with the ethical evaluation of all questions involving biology and medicine, or only a subset of these questions. Some bioethicists would narrow ethical evaluation only to the morality of medical treatments or technological innovations, and the timing of medical treatment of humans. Others would increase the scope of moral assessment to encompass the morality of all moves that would possibly assist or damage organisms successful of feeling fear.

The scope of bioethics has expanded beyond biotechnology, and while including topics such as cloning, gene therapy, life extension, human genetic engineering, it can also include astroethics and life in space, and manipulation of basic biology through altered DNA, XNA and proteins. These (and other) developments may affect future evolution and require new principles that address life at its core, such as biotic ethics that values life itself at its basic biological processes and structures, and seeks their propagation. Moving beyond the biological, issues raised in public health such as vaccination and resource allocation have also encouraged the development of novel ethics frameworks to address such challenges. A study published in 2022 based on the corpus of full papers from eight main bioethics journals demonstrated the heterogeneity of this field by distinguishing 91 topics that have been discussed in these journals over the past half a century.

Historian Yuval Noah Harari sees an existential threat in an arms race in artificial intelligence and bioengineering and he expressed the need for close co-operation between nations to solve the threats by technological disturbance. Harari stated AI and biotechnology should damage what it capability to be human.

Professional practice 
Bioethics as a subject of expert exercise (although now not a formal profession) developed at the beginning in North America in the Nineteen Eighties and Nineteen Nineties, in the areas of clinical / medical ethics and research ethics. Slowly internationalizing as a field, since the 2000s professional bioethics has expanded to include other specialties, such as organizational ethics in health systems, public health ethics, and more recently Ethics of artificial intelligence. Professional ethicists may be called consultants, ethicists, coordinators, or even analysts; and they may work in healthcare organizations, government agencies, and in both the public and private sectors. They may also be full-time employees, unbiased consultants, or have cross-appointments with educational institutions, such as lookup centres or universities.

Learned societies and professional associations 
The field of bioethics has developed national and international learned societies and professional associations, such as the American Society for Bioethics and Humanities, the Canadian Bioethics Society, the Canadian Association of Research Ethics Boards, the Association of Bioethics Program Directors, the Bangladesh Bioethics Society and the International Association of Bioethics.

Principles 

One of the first areas addressed by modern bioethicists was that of human experimentation.  The National Commission for the Protection of Human Subjects of Biomedical and Behavioral Research was initially established in 1974 to identify the basic ethical principles that should underlie the conduct of biomedical and behavioral research involving human subjects.  However, the fundamental principles announced in the Belmont Report (1979)—namely, respect for persons, beneficence and justice—have influenced the thinking of bioethicists across a wide range of issues.  Others have added non-maleficence, human dignity, and the sanctity of life to this list of cardinal values. 
Overall, the Belmont Report has guided lookup in a course centered on defending prone topics as properly as pushing for transparency between the researcher and the subject. Research has flourished within the past 40 years and due to the advance in technology, it is thought that human subjects have outgrown the Belmont Report, and the need for revision is desired.

Another essential precept of bioethics is its placement of cost on dialogue and presentation. Numerous dialogue based totally bioethics corporations exist in universities throughout the United States to champion precisely such goals. Examples include the Ohio State Bioethics Society and the Bioethics Society of Cornell. Professional level versions of these organizations also exist.

Many bioethicists, in particular scientific scholars, accord the easiest precedence to autonomy. They trust that every affected person ought to decide which direction of motion they think about most in line with their beliefs. In other words, the patient should always have the freedom to choose their own treatment .

Medical ethics 
Medical ethics is a utilized department of ethics that analyzes the exercise of clinical medicinal drug and associated scientific research. Medical ethics is based totally on a set of values that gurus can refer to in the case of any confusion or conflict. These values consist of the appreciation for autonomy, beneficence, and justice.

Ethics affects medical decisions made by healthcare providers and patients. Medical ethics is the study of moral values and judgments as they apply to medicine. The four main moral commitments are respect for autonomy, beneficence, nonmaleficence, and justice. Using these four principles and thinking about what the physicians' specific concern is for their scope of practice can help physicians make moral decisions. As a scholarly discipline, medical ethics encompasses its practical application in clinical settings as well as work on its history, philosophy, theology, and sociology.

Medical ethics tends to be understood narrowly as applied professional ethics; whereas bioethics has a more expansive application, touching upon the philosophy of science and issues of biotechnology. The two fields often overlap, and the distinction is more so a matter of style than professional consensus. Medical ethics shares many principles with other branches of healthcare ethics, such as nursing ethics. A bioethicist assists the health care and research community in examining moral issues involved in our understanding of life and death, and resolving ethical dilemmas in medicine and science. Examples of this would be the topic of equality in medicine, the intersection of cultural practices and medical care, ethical distribution of healthcare resources in pandemics, and issues of bioterrorism.

Medical ethical concerns frequently touch on matters of life and death. Patient rights, informed consent, confidentiality, competency, advance directives, carelessness, and many other topics are highlighted as serious health concerns.

The proper actions to take in light of all the circumstances are what ethics is all about. It discusses the difference between what is proper and wrong at a certain moment and a particular society. Medical ethics is concerned with the duties that doctors, hospitals, and other healthcare providers have to patients, society, and other health professionals.

The health profession has a set of ethical standards that are relevant to various organizations of health workers and medical facilities. Ethics are never stagnant and always relevant. What is seen as acceptable ethics now may not be so one hundred years ago. The hospital administrator is required to have a thorough awareness of their moral and legal obligations.

Medical sociology 
The practice of bioethics in clinical care have been studied by medical sociology. Many scholars consider that bioethics arose in response to a perceived lack of accountability in medical care in the 1970s. Studying the clinical practice of ethics in medical care, Hauschildt and Vries found that ethical questions were often reframed as clinical judgments to allow clinicians to make decisions. Ethicists most often put key decisions in the hands of physicians rather than patients.

Communication strategies suggested by ethicists act to decrease patient autonomy. Examples include, clinicians discussing treatment options with one another prior to talking to patients or their family to present a united front limited patient autonomy, hiding uncertainty amongst clinicians. Decisions about overarching goals of treatment were reframed as technical matters excluding patients and their families. Palliative care experts were used as intermediaries to guide patients towards less invasive end-of-live treatment. In their study, Hauschild and Vries found that 76% of ethical consultants were trained as clinicians.

Studying informed consent, Corrigan found that some social processes resulted in limitations to patients choice, but also at times patients could find questions regarding consent to medical trials burdensome.

The most prevalent subject is how social stratification (based on SES, gender, class, ethnicity, and age) affects patterns of behavior related to health and sickness, illness risk, disability, and other outcomes related to health care. The study of health care organization and provision, which encompasses the evolving organizational structures of health care organizations and the social psychology of health and health care, is another important approach. These latter research cover topics including connections between doctors and patients, coping mechanisms, and social support. The description of other important fields of medical sociology study emphasizes how theory and research have changed in the twenty-first century.

Perspectives and methodology
Bioethicists come from a wide variety of backgrounds and have training in a diverse array of disciplines. 
The field contains individuals trained in philosophy such as Baruch Brody of Rice University, Arthur Caplan of NYU, Peter Singer of Princeton University, Daniel Callahan of the Hastings Center, and Daniel Brock of Harvard University; medically trained clinician ethicists such as Mark Siegler of the University of Chicago and Joseph Fins of Cornell University; lawyers such as Nancy Dubler of Albert Einstein College of Medicine or Jerry Menikoff of the federal Office for Human Research Protections; political scientists like Francis Fukuyama; religious studies scholars including James Childress; and theologians like Lisa Sowle Cahill and Stanley Hauerwas. The field, formerly dominated by formally trained philosophers, has become increasingly interdisciplinary, with some critics even claiming that the methods of analytic philosophy have harmed the field's development. Leading journals in the field include The Journal of Medicine and Philosophy, the Hastings Center Report, the American Journal of Bioethics, the Journal of Medical Ethics, Bioethics, the Kennedy Institute of Ethics Journal and the Cambridge Quarterly of Healthcare Ethics. Bioethics has also benefited from the process philosophy developed by Alfred North Whitehead.

Another discipline that discusses bioethics is the field of feminism; the International Journal of Feminist Approaches to Bioethics has played an important role in organizing and legitimizing feminist work in bioethics.

Many religious communities have their histories of inquiry into bioethical issues and have developed rules and guidelines on how to deal with these issues from within the viewpoint of their respective faiths. The Jewish, Christian and Muslim faiths have each developed a considerable body of literature on these matters.  In the case of many non-Western cultures, a strict separation of religion from philosophy does not exist.  In many Asian cultures, for example, there is a lively discussion on bioethical issues.  Buddhist bioethics, in general, is characterized by a naturalistic outlook that leads to a rationalistic, pragmatic approach. Buddhist bioethicists include Damien Keown. In India, Vandana Shiva is a leading bioethicist speaking from the Hindu tradition.

In Africa, and partly also in Latin America, the debate on bioethics frequently focuses on its practical relevance in the context of underdevelopment and geopolitical power relations. In Africa, their bioethical approach is influenced by and similar to Western bioethics due to the colonization of many African countries. Some African bioethicists are calling for a shift in bioethics that utilizes indigenous African philosophy rather than western philosophy. Some African bioethicists also believe that Africans will be more likely to accept a bioethical approach grounded in their own culture, as well as empower African people.

Masahiro Morioka argues that in Japan the bioethics movement was first launched by disability activists and feminists in the early 1970s, while academic bioethics began in the mid-1980s. During this period, unique philosophical discussions on brain death and disability appeared both in the academy and journalism. In Chinese culture and bioethics, there is not as much of an emphasis on autonomy as opposed to the heavy emphasis placed on autonomy in Western bioethics. Community, social values, and family are all heavily valued in Chinese culture, and contribute to the lack of emphasis on autonomy in Chinese bioethics. The Chinese believe that the family, community, and individual are all interdependent of each other, so it is common for the family unit to collectively make decisions regarding healthcare and medical decisions for a loved one, instead of an individual making an independent decision for his or her self.

Some argue that spirituality and understanding one another as spiritual beings and moral agents is an important aspect of bioethics and that spirituality and bioethics are heavily intertwined with one another. As a healthcare provider, it is important to know and understand varying world views and religious beliefs. Having this knowledge and understanding can empower healthcare providers with the ability to better treat and serve their patients. Developing a connection and understanding of a patient's moral agent helps enhance the care provided to the patient. Without this connection or understanding, patients can be at risk of becoming "faceless units of work" and being looked at as a "set of medical conditions" as opposed to the storied and spiritual beings that they are.

Islamic bioethics 
Bioethics in the realm of Islam differs from Western bioethics, but they share some similar perspectives viewpoints as well. Western bioethics is focused on rights, especially individual rights. Islamic bioethics focuses more on religious duties and obligations, such as seeking treatment and preserving life. Islamic bioethics is heavily influenced and connected to the teachings of the Qur'an as well as the teachings of Prophet Muhammad. These influences essentially make it an extension of Shariah or Islamic Law. In Islamic bioethics, passages from the Qur'an are often used to validate various medical practices. For example, a passage from the Qur'an states "whosoever killeth a human being ... it shall be as if he had killed all humankind, and whosoever saveth the life of one, it shall be as if he saved the life of all humankind." This excerpt can be used to encourage using medicine and medical practices to save lives, but can also be looked at as a protest against euthanasia and assisted suicide. A high value and worth are placed on human life in Islam, and in turn, human life is deeply valued in the practice of Islamic bioethics as well. Muslims believe all human life, even one of poor quality, needs to be given appreciation and must be cared for and conserved.

The Islamic education on sensible problems associated to existence in normal and human lifestyles in unique can be sought in Islamic bioethics. As we will see later, due to the fact of interconnectedness of the Islamic regulation and the Islamic ethics, the Islamic bioethics has to reflect onconsideration on necessities of the Islamic regulation (Shari‘ah) in addition to ethical considerations.

To react to new technological and medical advancements, informed Islamic jurists regularly will hold conferences to discuss new bioethical issues and come to an agreement on where they stand on the issue from an Islamic perspective. This allows Islamic bioethics to stay pliable and responsive to new advancements in medicine. The standpoints taken by Islamic jurists on bioethical issues are not always unanimous decisions and at times may differ. There is much diversity among Muslims varying from country to country, and the different degrees to which they adhere by Shariah. Differences and disagreements in regards to jurisprudence, theology, and ethics between the two main branches of Islam, Sunni, and Shia, lead to differences in the methods and ways in which Islamic bioethics is practiced throughout the Islamic world. An area where there is a lack of consensus is brain death. The Organization of Islamic Conferences Islamic Fiqh Academy (OIC-IFA) holds the view that brain death is equivalent to cardiopulmonary death, and acknowledges brain death in an individual as the individual being deceased. On the contrary, the Islamic Organization of Medical Sciences (IOMS) states that brain death is an "intermediate state between life and death" and does not acknowledge a brain dead individual as being deceased.

Islamic bioethicists look to the Qur'an and religious leaders regarding their outlook on reproduction and abortion. It is firmly believed that the reproduction of a human child can only be proper and legitimate via marriage. This does not mean that a child can only be reproduced via sexual intercourse between a married couple, but that the only proper and legitimate way to have a child is when it is an act between husband and wife. It is okay for a married couple to have a child artificially and from techniques using modern biotechnology as opposed to sexual intercourse, but to do this out of the context of marriage would be deemed immoral.

Islamic bioethics is strongly against abortion and strictly prohibits it. The IOMS states that "from the moment a zygote settles inside a woman's body, it deserves a unanimously recognized degree of respect." Abortion may only be permitted in unique situations where it is considered to be the "lesser evil".

Islamic bioethics may be used to find advice on practical matters relating to life in general and human life in particular. As we will see later, Islamic bioethics must take into account both moral concerns and the requirements of the Islamic law (Shari'ah) due to the interdependence of Islamic law and Islamic ethics. In order to avoid making a mistake, everything must be thoroughly examined, first against moral criteria and then against legal ones. It appears that many writers on Islamic bioethics have failed to distinguish between the two.

Despite the fact that Islamic law and morality are completely in agreement with one another, they may have distinct prescriptions because of their diverse ends and objectives. One distinction, for instance, is that Islamic ethics seeks to teach those with higher desires how to become more perfect and closer to God, but Islamic law seeks to decrease criteria for perfection or pleasure in both realms that are doable for the average or even lower than average.

So whatever is deemed essential or required by Islamic law is undoubtedly viewed the same way by Islamic ethics. However, there may be situations where something is not against Islamic law but is nonetheless condemned by Islamic ethics. Or there can be circumstances that, while not required by Islamic law, are essential from an ethical standpoint. For instance, while idle conversation is not strictly forbidden by Islamic law, it is morally unacceptable since it wastes time and is detrimental to one's spiritual growth. The night prayers are another illustration (which should be performed after midnight and before dawn).

Islamic bioethics's first influences Islamic bioethics is founded on the Qur'an, the Sunnah, and reason (al-'aql), much like any other inquiry into Islam. Sunni Muslims may use terms like ijmaa' (consensus) and qiyas in place of reason (analogy). Ijmaa' and qiyas as such are not recognized by Shi'a since they are insufficient proofs on their own.

Christian bioethics 
In Christian bioethics it is noted that the Bible, especially the New Testament, teaches about healing by faith. Healing in the Bible is often associated with the ministry of specific individuals including Elijah, Jesus and Paul. The largest group of miracles mentioned in the New Testament involves cures, the Gospels give varying amounts of detail for each episode, sometimes Jesus cures simply by saying a few words, at other times, he employs material such as spit and mud.

Christian physician Reginald B. Cherry views faith healing as a pathway of healing in which God uses both the natural and the supernatural to heal. Being healed has been described as a privilege of accepting Christ's redemption on the cross. Pentecostal writer Wilfred Graves Jr. views the healing of the body as a physical expression of salvation. , after describing Jesus exorcising at sunset and healing all of the sick who were brought to him, quotes these miracles as a fulfillment of the prophecy in : "He took up our infirmities and carried our diseases".

Jesus endorsed the use of the medical assistance of the time (medicines of oil and wine) when he told the parable of the Good Samaritan (Luke 10:25–37), who "bound up [an injured man's] wounds, pouring on oil and wine" (verse 34) as a physician would. Jesus then told the doubting teacher of the law (who had elicited this parable by his self-justifying question, "And who is my neighbor?" in verse 29) to "go, and do likewise" in loving others with whom he would never ordinarily associate (verse 37).

The principle of the sacredness of human life is at the basis of Catholic bioethics. On the subject of abortion, for example, Catholics and Orthodox are on very similar positions. Catholic bioethics insists on this concept, without exception, while Anglicans, Waldensians and Lutherans have positions closer to secular ones, for example with regard to the end of life.

In 1936, Ludwig Bieler argued that Jesus was stylized in the New Testament in the image of the "divine man" (Greek: theios aner), which was widespread in antiquity. It is said that many of the famous rulers and elders of the time had divine healing powers.

contemporary bioethical and health care policy issues, including abortion, the distribution of limited resources, the nature of appropriate hospital chaplaincy, fetal experimentation, the use of fetal tissue in treatment, genetic engineering, the use of critical care units, distinctions between ordinary and extraordinary treatment, euthanasia, free and informed consent, competency determinations, the meaning of life, will be examined within the framework of traditional Christian moral commitments.

Feminist bioethics 
Feminist bioethics critiques the fields of bioethics and medicine for its lack of inclusion of women's and other marginalized group's perspectives. This lack of perspective from women is thought to create power imbalances that favor men. These power imbalances are theorized to be created from the androcentric nature of medicine. One example of a lack of consideration of women is in clinical drug trials that exclude women due to hormonal fluctuations and possible future birth defects. This has led to a gap in the research on how pharmaceuticals can affect women. Feminist bioethicists call for the necessity of feminist approaches to bioethics because the lack of diverse perspectives in bioethics and medicine can cause preventable harm to already vulnerable groups.

This study first gained prevalence in the field of reproductive medicine as it was viewed as a "woman's issue". Since then, feminist approaches to bioethics has expanded to include bioethical topics in mental health, disability advocacy, healthcare accessibility, and pharmaceuticals. Lindemann notes the need for the future agenda of feminist approaches to bioethics to expand further to include healthcare organizational ethics, genetics, stem cell research, and more.

Notable figures in feminist bioethics include Carol Gilligan, Susan Sherwin, and the creators of the International Journal of Feminist Approaches to Bioethics, Mary C. Rawlinson and Anne Donchin. Sherwin's book No Longer Patient: Feminist Ethics in Health Care (1992) is credited with being one of the first full-length books published on the topic of feminist bioethics and points out the shortcomings in then-current bioethical theories. Sherwin's viewpoint incorporates models of oppression within healthcare that intend to further marginalize women, people of color, immigrants, and people with disabilities. Since created in 1992, the International Journal of Feminist Approaches to Bioethics has done much work to legitimize feminist work and theory in bioethics.

By pointing out the male marking of its purportedly generic human subject and the fact that the tradition does not see women's rights as human rights, feminist bioethics challenges bioethics. This article explores how the other gender becomes mute and invisible as a result of this unseen gendering of the universal. It demonstrates how the dehumanization of "man" is a root cause of illness on a social and personal level. Finally, it makes many recommendations for how representations of women's experience and bodies could help to constructively reconsider fundamental ethical principles.

Environmental bioethics
Bioethics, the ethics of the life sciences in general, expanded from the encounter between experts in medicine and the laity, to include organizational and social ethics, environmental ethics. As of 2019 textbooks of green bioethics existed.

Ethical issues in gene therapy 
Gene therapy involves ethics, because scientists are making changes to genes, the building blocks of the human body. Currently, therapeutic gene therapy is available to treat specific genetic disorders by editing cells in specific body parts. For example, gene therapy can treat hematopoietic disease. There is also a controversial gene therapy called "germline gene therapy", in which genes in a sperm or egg can be edited to prevent genetic disorder in the future generation. It is unknown how this type of gene therapy affects long-term human development. In the United States, federal funding cannot be used to research germline gene therapy.

Education 
Bioethics is taught in courses at the undergraduate and graduate level in different academic disciplines or programs, such as Philosophy, Medicine, Law, Social Sciences. It has become a requirement for professional accreditation in many health professional programs (Medicine, Nursing, Rehabilitation), to have obligatory training in ethics (e.g., professional ethics, medical ethics, clinical ethics, nursing ethics). Interest in the field and professional opportunities have led to the development of dedicated programs with concentrations in Bioethics, largely in the United States, Canada (List of Canadian bioethics programs) and Europe, offering undergraduate majors/minors, graduate certificates, and master's and doctoral degrees.

Training in bioethics (usually clinical, medical, or professional ethics) are part of core competency requirements for health professionals in fields such as nursing, medicine or rehabilitation. For example, every medical school in Canada teaches bioethics so that students can gain an understanding of biomedical ethics and use the knowledge gained in their future careers to provide better patient care. Canadian residency training programs are required to teach bioethics as it is one of the conditions of accreditation, and is a requirement by the College of Family Physicians of Canada and by the Royal College of Physicians and Surgeons of Canada.

Criticism
As a field of study, bioethics has also drawn criticism. For instance, Paul Farmer noted that bioethics tends to focus its attention on problems that arise from "too much care" for patients in industrialized nations while giving little or no attention to the ethical problem of too little care for the poor. Farmer characterizes the bioethics of handling morally difficult clinical situations, normally in hospitals in industrialized countries, as "quandary ethics". He does not regard quandary ethics and clinical bioethics as unimportant; he argues, rather, that bioethics must be balanced and give due weight to the poor.

Additionally, bioethics has been condemned for its lack of diversity in thought, particularly concerning race. Even as the field has grown to include the areas of public opinion, policymaking, and medical decision-making, little to no academic writing has been authored concerning the intersection between race–especially the cultural values imbued in that construct–and bioethical literature. John Hoberman illustrates this in a 2016 critique, in which he points out that bioethicists have been traditionally resistant to expanding their discourse to include sociological and historically relevant applications. Central to this is the notion of white normativity, which establishes the dominance of white hegemonic structures in bioethical academia and tends to reinforce existing biases.

These points and critiques, along with the neglect of women's perspectives within bioethics, have also been discussed amongst feminist bioethical scholars.

However, differing views on bioethics' lack of diversity of thought and social inclusivity have also been advanced. For example, one historian has argued that the diversity of thought and social inclusivity are the two essential cornerstones of bioethics, albeit they have not been fully realized.

On order to practice critical bioethics, bioethicists must base their investigations in empirical research, refute ideas with facts, engage in self-reflection, and be skeptical of the assertions made by other bioethicists, scientists, and doctors. A thorough normative study of actual moral experience is what is intended.

Issues
Research in bioethics is conducted by a broad and interdisciplinary community of scholars, and is not restricted only to those researchers who define themselves as "bioethicists": it includes researchers from the humanities, social sciences, health sciences and health professions, law, the fundamental sciences, etc. These researchers may be working in specialized bioethics centers and institutes associated with university bioethics training programs; but they may also be based in disciplinary departments without a specific bioethics focus. Notable examples of research centers include, amongst others, The Hastings Center, the Kennedy Institute of Ethics, the Yale Interdisciplinary Center for Bioethics, the Centre for Human Bioethics.

Areas of bioethics research that are the subject of published, peer-reviewed bioethical analysis include:

See also 

 List of bioethics journals
 List of Canadian bioethics programs
 Biotechnology risk
 Cytoplasmic transfer
 The Hastings Center
 Johns Hopkins Berman Institute of Bioethics
 Medical law
 Neuroethics
 Preimplantation genetic diagnosis
 Resources for clinical ethics consultation
 The Convention on Human Rights and Biomedicine

References

Further reading

External links 

 Bioethics entry in the Internet Encyclopedia of Philosophy.
 "Feminist Bioethics" at the Stanford Encyclopedia of Philosophy
 "MyBioethics" a free online resource (app) for learning bioethics through real cases.

 
Ethics
Philosophy of biology